Future Cop  may refer to:

 Future Cop: LAPD, a 1998 third-person shooter published and developed by Electronic Arts 
 Future Cop (TV series), an American science fiction television series
 Future Cops, a 1993 Hong Kong action-comedy film loosely based on the Street Fighter video game franchise.
 Trancers, a 1984 science fiction film that was also released under the name Future Cop.